The men's decathlon event at the 2010 World Junior Championships in Athletics was held in Moncton, New Brunswick, Canada, at Moncton Stadium on 20 and 21 July.  Junior implements were used, i.e. 99.0 cm (3'3) hurdles, 6 kg shot and 1.75 kg discus.

Medalists

Results

Final
20/21 July

Participation
According to an unofficial count, 26 athletes from 17 countries participated in the event.

References

Decathlon
Combined events at the World Athletics U20 Championships